The Walls Came Tumbling Down is a film script written by author Robert Anton Wilson, first published in book form in 1997.

Plot summary
The introduction of the book includes Wilson's thoughts abouts many things, including UFOs, Magna Carta, the IRA and Nelson Mandela. It also includes Wilson's explanation of how he wrote the screenplay after a film deal had collapsed and he was trying to get another deal together.

The book deals with the sometimes frightening experiences that happen to those who stumble into an expanded consciousness without any intent to go there and without any preparation or Operating Manual to tell them how to navigate when the walls tumble and the doors of perception fly open, leaving the brain suddenly free of the limits of "mind".

Title references
The title refers not only to the walls of Jericho in the Bible story but also to the tunnel-walls of the labyrinth of Minos in the Greek myth, which hid Theseus and the Minotaur from each other before their final confrontation. It also refers to the Leary-Wilson reality-tunnels.
The plot revolves around three characters, Michael, Simon, and Cathy.

See also
Mystical experiences
Ego death
Higher consciousness
Religious ecstasy

External links
Excerpt from The Walls Came Tumbling Down

1997 books
Books by Robert Anton Wilson